Field hockey at the 2015 Southeast Asian Games was held in Sengkang Hockey Stadium, Singapore from 6 to 13 June 2015. Medals were awarded in one discipline for both men and women competitions.

Participating nations
A total of 144 athletes from five nations will be competing in field hockey at the 2015 Southeast Asian Games:

Competition schedule
The following is the competition schedule for the field hockey competitions:

Medalists

Medal table

Men's tournament

Preliminary round

Medal round

Bronze medal match

Gold medal match

Final standings

Women's tournament

Preliminary round

Medal round

Bronze medal match

Gold medal match

Final standings

References

External links
 

2015
Southeast Asian Games
Field hockey
2015 Southeast Asian Games